The 1992 Croatian Football Cup was the first season of Croatia's modern football knockout competition. The teams in Bold won.

Brackets

Quarter-finals

The quarter-final legs were held on 24 March and 21 April 1992. Croatia Đakovo were given a bye to the semi-finals. 

|}

Semi-finals

First legs

Second legs

Inker Zaprešić won 7–1 on aggregate.

3–3 on aggregate. HAŠK Građanski won 3–1 in penalty shootout.

Final

First leg

Second leg

Inker Zaprešić won 2–1 on aggregate.

See also
1992 Croatian First Football League

External links
Official website 
1992 Croatian Football Cup at rsssf.org
1992 Cup final at rsssf.org

Croatian Football Cup seasons
Croatian Cup, 1992
Croatian Cup
1991–92 in Croatian football